Ahmed Ben Triki, sometimes referred to as Ben Zengli, (1650–1750) was a poet from Tlemcen, in Ottoman Algeria.

Biography 
Ahmed Ben Triki was born in Tlemcen,  in Ottoman Algeria, in 1650 to a Turkish father. He began writing poetry at an early age and was taught by the poet Saïd El-Mendassi.

Poetry
One of his most notable poems "My pain Endures…" was written in Morocco, in 1652, after the Ottoman authorities banished Ben Triki from Tlemcen. Many of his poems were written during this period of exile and express his painful separation from his homeland.

On his return to Algeria, he mainly composed panegyrics of the Islamic prophet Muhammad. Nonetheless, his poem "Burned to the Depths of My Soul!", a religious poem, was an innovative qasida which praised the Kaaba in Mecca; Ben Triki transposed the Sufi ghazal devices originally applied to the love of God or ones "Beloved" to the description of the physical features of a place.

Ben Triki’s acclaimed poems lead his contemporary Sidi Mohammed Ben Msaieb to praise the poet as follows: "Ben Triki is possessed by a great jinn, but this jinn was mistaken when he chose such a home!".

References

1650 births
1750 deaths
People from Tlemcen
Algerian people of Turkish descent
17th-century Algerian poets
Algerian male poets
17th-century male writers
17th-century Algerian people
18th-century Algerian poets